João Gomes (born 2 May 1985), commonly known as Betinho, is a Portuguese professional basketball player for Benfica in the Portuguese Basketball League.

Club career
Born in Fogo, Cape Verde, Betinho started playing basketball at Portuguese club FC Barreirense, where he developed his skills, and was then noticed by American and European scouts. His performance with Barreirense led to an invitation to play in the 2006 and 2007 Reebok EuroCamp editions in Treviso. He was eligible for the 2007 NBA draft. After working out for several NBA teams such as the Boston Celtics, Portland Trail Blazers, and Detroit Pistons, he went undrafted.

On 22 August 2011, Betinho was confirmed as a new signing for Benfica in Portugal. He left the club in 2014 and returned in July 2019.

International career
Betinho was a member of the Portugal national team in the FIBA EuroBasket 2009 qualification.

Honours
Benfica
Portuguese League: 2011–12, 2012–13, 2013–14, 2021-22
Portuguese Cup: 2013–14
Portuguese League Cup: 2012–13, 2013–14
Portuguese Super Cup: 2012, 2013
António Pratas Trophy: 2011–12, 2012–13

References

1985 births
Living people
Aquila Basket Trento players
BC Andorra players
Expatriate basketball people in Andorra
Cape Verdean men's basketball players
CB Breogán players
Lega Basket Serie A players
Liga ACB players
People from Fogo, Cape Verde
Portuguese men's basketball players
Portuguese sportspeople of Cape Verdean descent
S.L. Benfica basketball players
Small forwards